The color vanilla is a rich tint of off-white as well as a medium pale tint of yellow.

The first recorded use of vanilla as a color name in English was in 1925.

Variations of vanilla

Vanilla ice 

At right is displayed the color vanilla ice.

The color name vanilla ice for this pinkish tone of vanilla has been in use at least since 2001, when it was one of the colors on the Resene color list.

Dark vanilla 

At right is displayed the color dark vanilla.

This is the color called vanilla on the Xona.com Color List.

Vanilla in culture 

Film
 Vanilla Sky is a 2001 American psychological thriller film directed by Cameron Crowe.

Music
 Vanilla Ice is an American rapper whose single "Ice Ice Baby" was the first hip hop single to top the Billboard charts--this occurred in 1990.

See also 
 Chocolate (color)
 List of colors

References 

Shades of white
Shades of yellow